Rikasikha is a rural locality (a village) and the administrative center of Primorskoye Rural Settlement of Primorsky District, Arkhangelsk Oblast, Russia. The population was 1,877 as of 2010. The locality contains 11 streets.

Geography 
Rikasikha is located 28 km west of Arkhangelsk (the district's administrative centre) by road. Lichka is the nearest rural locality.

References 

Rural localities in Primorsky District, Arkhangelsk Oblast